Naval Base Merauke  was a United States Navy base built during World War II at city of Merauke in the South Papua province of Indonesia, then Papua New Guinea. The base was 2 miles from the mouth of the Merauke River. The US Navy built a PT boat base and base dock with anchorage to support the Pacific War and the New Guinea campaign.

History
Merauke is a tropical city on the south coast of New Guinea Island. Base construction started on May 8, 1943 with the arrival of Seabees of the 55th Battalion. Much of the port had been destroyed by Japanese bombs. Seabee removed debris and repaired that which was usable. With the port dock destroyed, cows and barges were used to bring supply to shore, while a temporary wharf was built. A Seabee camp was built and a water purification plant. A permanent 300-foot pier and a PT boat base were completed on September 3.

On June 28 a 6,000-foot runway construction was started and was completed on July 7, 1943. The Empire of Japan had bases on the north shore of New Guinea, so the base was attacked by air sometimes with strafing and bombing. The first attack was on May 11, with no injuries, and some loss of gear. Naval Base Merauke operated daily reconnaissance patrols and the US Army did bombing missions from the runway. Merauke Force operated out of the base also.

Bases and facilities
Anchorage 
PT boat Bases
Tank farm
Naval Port facilities
Supply depot
Fuel depot
Ammunition depot on Frances Bay
Seabees camp
Merauke Airfield 6,000-foot runway, that is now Mopah International Airport

Gallery

See also
 US Naval Advance Bases
Naval Base Darwin
Naval Base Milne Bay
No. 84 Squadron RAAF
New Guinea campaign
US Naval Base New Guinea

References

External links
youtube, Merauke Force
youtube, Battle for New Guinea 1942-1945

Merauke|Naval Base Merauke
Naval Stations of the United States Navy
World War II airfields in the Pacific Ocean Theater
Airfields of the United States Navy
Military installations closed in the 1940s
Closed installations of the United States Navy